Edson Carlos Santos Lima Júnior (born 10 January 1988), simply known as Capa, is a Brazilian footballer who plays as a left back.

Club career
Born in Serrinha, Bahia, Capa started his career clube profissional de Santa Catarina Marcílio Dias and in the following years, he represented Grêmio Osasco, Hermann Aichinger, Operário Ferroviário and Guarani de Palhoça.

On 6 June 2016, Capa joined Série B o clube de Avaí on a season long loan deal. On 25 June, he made his debut in the tournament, coming as a 46th minute substitute for Célio in a 1–1 draw against Tupi.
He featured 26 times for the league with his side winning promotion to Série A.

On 18 December 2016, Capa signed permanently with Avaí on a contract extending until 2019, with the club securing 70% of the player's rights. An undisputed starter, he contributed with 29 league matches as his side was relegated to the second tier. After extending his contract with Avaí until 2020, Capa joined Sport on a year long loan deal on 9 January 2018.

On 3 January 2019, Capa was loaned out to São Caetano for the Campeonato Paulista A1 season.

Club statistics

Honours 
Avaí
Campeonato Catarinense: 2021

References

External links

1992 births
Living people
Association football defenders
Brazilian footballers
Campeonato Brasileiro Série A players
Campeonato Brasileiro Série B players
Campeonato Brasileiro Série D players
Clube Náutico Marcílio Dias players
Clube Atlético Hermann Aichinger players
Guarani de Palhoça players
Operário Ferroviário Esporte Clube players
Avaí FC players
Sport Club do Recife players
Associação Desportiva São Caetano players
Esporte Clube Vitória players
Tombense Futebol Clube players
Esporte Clube São Luiz players
Esporte Clube XV de Novembro (Piracicaba) players